Humboldt Lagoons State Park is a California State Park on the Redwood Coast, in Humboldt County, California. It is located along U.S. Route 101 between Trinidad and Orick. The park protects three lagoons with estuaries and wetlands.

Geography
Big Lagoon is the largest and southernmost lagoon.  Stone Lagoon is in the middle, and Freshwater Lagoon is the northernmost and smallest.

The lagoons are shallow bays between rocky headlands where coastal wave action has formed a sandy bar separating each lagoon from the ocean.  The  park was established in 1931.

The lagoons are resting areas for migratory waterfowl using the Pacific Flyway between Lake Earl on the Smith River estuarine wetlands  to the north and Humboldt Bay on the Mad River estuarine wetlands  to the south.  Studies around Humboldt Bay indicate tectonic activity along the Cascadia subduction zone has caused local sea level changes at intervals of several centuries.  The alluvial plain forming each shallow lagoon may support freshwater wetlands or Sitka Spruce forests following uplift events and salt marsh or inundated shellfish beds following subsidence events.

Dry Lagoon 

Dry Lagoon, at the southern end of Stone Lagoon, is separated from Stone Lagoon by what may become an island if the sea level rises.  Dry Lagoon is presently a wetland representing natural conditions of similar land used for a sawmill near Big Lagoon, or converted to agricultural purposes around the estuaries of Redwood Creek to the north and Little River to the south.

See also
List of beaches in California
List of California state parks

References

External links 
Official Humboldt Lagoons State Park website

State parks of California
Parks in Humboldt County, California
Lagoons of California
Lagoons of Humboldt County, California
Protected areas established in 1931
1931 establishments in California